Ng'iya Girls High School is a girls' national school in Ng'iya Township, Siaya County, in Western Kenya.

History and operations
The school was founded in 1923 as a primary school. In 1953 it became a teacher training college (TTC). In 1962, Ng'iya Girls became a secondary school and admitted its first form one students who sat their “O” level exams in 1965.

In 1971, it enrolled the first A-Level science class offering Science and Arts A-Level classes. This continued till 1989, when the A-level system was phased out.

The school was identified as a Centre of Excellence in 2010, and officially promoted to a national school in 2012.

In 2018, it was closed after it was damaged by students protesting the school's management.

Notable alumnae
 Grace Ogot, author, nurse, journalist, politician and diplomat
 Mary Abukutsa-Onyango, humanitarian and agricultural scientist
 Grace Onyango, politician

See also

 Education in Kenya
 List of schools in Kenya

References

1923 establishments in Kenya
Education in Nyanza Province
Educational institutions established in 1923
Elementary and primary schools in Kenya
Girls' schools in Kenya
High schools and secondary schools in Kenya
Siaya County